Federal agency may refer to:
United States federal agencies—see List of federal agencies in the United States
Federal agency (Germany)

See also
Government agency
Intelligence agency
Statutory corporation
Statutory Agency
Crown corporation
Government-owned corporation
Regulatory agency
Public bodies
Non-departmental public body